The Central New Brunswick Woodsmen's Museum is a Canadian forestry museum located in Boiestown, New Brunswick.

The museum is located on a  site alongside Highway 8 and the Southwest Miramichi River.

Its collection includes tools and models which demonstrate the history of the forestry industry in New Brunswick and the Maritime Provinces.

Affiliations
The Museum is affiliated with: CMA,  CHIN, and Virtual Museum of Canada.

References

External links
 Central New Brunswick Woodsmen's Museum website

Museums in New Brunswick
Buildings and structures in Northumberland County, New Brunswick
Forestry museums in Canada
Tourist attractions in Northumberland County, New Brunswick